You Can Depend on Me may refer to:

"(You Can) Depend on Me," a 1959 song by Smokey Robinson and the Miracles
"You Can Depend on Me" (Louis Armstrong song), 1931, also recorded by Brenda Lee in 1961
"You Can Depend on Me" (Restless Heart song), 1991